Mississippi Department of Child Protective Services (MDCPS) is a state agency of Mississippi. It includes foster care services.

History

There was a court order circa 2008 on how MDCPS is supposed to manage its operations; according to documents from the Olivia Y. vs. Bryant case circa 2019, 37 of 113 requirements were being followed by MDCPS.

References

External links
 Mississippi Department of Child Protective Services

State agencies of Mississippi